An Act to amend the Criminal Code (Protection of Children and Other Vulnerable Persons) and the Canada Evidence Act is an act of the Parliament of Canada passed in 2005. The Act amended several statutes related to the consent of sexual acts, sexual offences, and child abuse.

The Act amended Section 153 of the Criminal Code to additionally prohibit the sexual touching of a person under the age of 18 if they are "in a relationship with a young person that is exploitative of the young person", increased various penalties related to child abuse, made voyeurism an offence, and expands the definition of child pornography to include audio recordings and writings "whose dominant characteristic is the description, for a sexual purpose, of sexual activity with a person under the age of eighteen years."

Legislative history 
The legislation was first introduced as Bill C-20 to the House of Commons on 5 December, 2002 in the second session of the 37th Canadian Parliament by Minister of Justice Martin Cauchon. It had not had its third reading when Parliament was prorogued in November 2003.

It was re-introduced as Bill C-12 in the third session of the 37th Parliament on 12 February, 2004.  Bill C-12 was deemed approved at all stages completed in the previous session, and passed in the House on 12 May but was not approved by the Senate at the time of prorogation on 23 May.

The bill was re-introduced for a third time as Bill C-2 on 8 October, 2004 in the first session of the 38th Canadian Parliament.  After moving from the House of Commons to the Senate, after its first Senate reading on 14 June, 2005 it was amended two days later, four days prior to its second Senate reading on 20 June, where it was passed.

See also
Canadian bills

References

 https://bdp.parl.ca/sites/PublicWebsite/default/en_CA/ResearchPublications/LegislativeSummaries/373LS467E

External links
Bill C-2: An Act to amend the Criminal Code (Protection of Children and other Vulnerable Persons) and the Canada Evidence Act

Canadian federal legislation
Sex laws
2005 in Canadian law